A  is a small automated monorail, or a fusion between monorail, people mover, and rack railway. Since this mode of transportation is relatively unknown, it lacks widely accepted generic name, other than the simple "monorail". The system is different from normal modern monorails in many ways. It is a development from industrial monorails used in 1960s orchards. Slope cars are installed in more than 80 places in Japan and South Korea.

Overview

The system is introduced generally when there are steep slopes or stairs between entrance gates and buildings. Slope cars generally function as amenities that provide accessibilities for elderly or handicapped people visiting particular places, such as parks, golf courses, or hotels. As most lines move fairly slowly, people without disabilities often find it faster to walk the same routes on foot, rather than to use slope cars. However, there are also places where slope cars climb very steep slopes which people without disabilities can not climb unless there are stairs. In Japan, slope cars are not legally considered as railways.

System
Some slope cars are "trainsets" consisting of two cars. Most slope cars are straddle-beam monorails, but there are suspended monorail slope cars as well. 
Normal monorails generally use rubber tyres running on a concrete beam, while slope cars use a steel beam with a rack rail on one side. As such, slope cars can climb 100% (45°) slopes at maximum speed. The system is powered by a "third rail" on the other side of the beam.

The system does not require a driver. A car starts when a user pushes a button, and it automatically stops at the selected destination.

History
In 1966, Yoneyama Industory, an agricultural machinery maker in Matsuyama, Ehime Prefecture, invented , a freight-only rack monorail system. It soon became widespread in mikan citrus orchards in the prefecture, and in other parts of Japan. Other makers also started to build similar systems. Later in 1990, a company called Chigusa developed a passenger rack monorail system. These rack monorails were first used to transport workers in construction sites or forests. However, from 1990s, public facilities such as parks also started to use the system.  started to sell their "slope cars" in 1990.

Similar systems were designed for vineyards in Switzerland and Germany in the 1960s. These were also transporting workers from the start. The brand name Monorack is used here for the Graventa Monorackbahn since 1976. The main difference is the type of rail being used - the Japanese systems use  and the European systems use  square tubing. The cooperation between Nikkari in Japan and Habegger in Switzerland started in 1975, so the Monorack tractors are mostly identical.

Other names
As "slope car" is the brand name of Kaho Manufacturing, similar, if not the same, concepts are called differently by different manufacturers.

Ansaku makes .
Chigusa makes .
Monorail Industry makes .
Senyō Kōgyō makes .
EMTC of Korea makes the Mountain Type (which has two rails) and the monorail Inclined Type and Locomotive Type
Doppelmayr Garaventa makes the Monorack for agricultural use.  They say they have installed 650 systems worldwide.

Slope cars are similar in some ways to personal rapid transit systems in that they offer on-demand service for individuals or small numbers of passengers.

List of slope cars

See also

Funicular
Monorail
Monorails in Japan
People mover
Personal rapid transit
Rack railway

References

External links
 Kaho Manufacturing official website
 Ansaku official website
 Chigusa official website
 Korea Monorail official website, South Korean agency of Kaho Manufacturing.
 Senyō Kōgyō official website
 EMCT Smart Monorail official website

Monorails in Japan
Vertical transport devices
Driverless monorails